The Puri Lukisan Ratna Wartha Museum is the oldest art museum in Bali which specialize in modern traditional Balinese paintings and wood carvings. The museum is located in Ubud, Bali, Indonesia. It is home to the finest collection of modern traditional Balinese painting and wood carving on the island, spanning from the pre-Independence war (1930–1945) to the post-Independence war (1945 – present) era. The collection includes important examples of all of the artistic styles in Bali including the Sanur, Batuan, Ubud, Young Artist and Keliki schools.

History

Museum Buildings 
 Building I (North) – the Pitamaha Gallery houses the Pre-War modern traditional Balinese paintings (1930–1945) and I Gusti Nyoman Lempad collection
 Building II (West) – the Ida Bagus Made Gallery houses the Ida Bagus Made Estate Collection
 Building III (East) – the Wayang Gallery houses Wayang Painting Collection.
 Building IV (South) - the Founders Gallery houses the Museum history and used for temporary exhibitions or shows new acquisitions

Highlights of the Collection 
 Ida Bagus Nyana (1912–1985)
Ida Bagus Nyana was a talented wood sculptor and a gifted dancer. He is known for his impressionistic, elongated woodcarvings whose fluid shapes, devoid of excessive detail, often appear as if they had been pulled from taffy. His sculpture of the Goddess Pertiwi (Mother Earth), with its spidery legs and coiled serpent, is dreamlike and surrealistic. Nyana's son, Ida Bagus Tilem, was also a talented woodcarver. Both father and son were known for their ability to impart life to inanimate wood, thereby transforming it into magnificent forms with a sense of movement and full use of all the dimensions.

 Ida Bagus Gelgel (1900–1937)
Ida Bagus Gelgel grew up in Kamasan, far away from direct western influence, but his works evolved beyond the conventions of the Wayang tradition. He was so creative, that in 1937 one of his paintings won a silver medal at the International Colonial Art Exhibition in Paris. One of his works, the Priest Dharmaswami, painted in 1935 using naturals dyes on paper, is one of the masterpieces of the Museum Puri Lukisan. It tells the story of a Priest who rescued a monkey, a snake and a tiger from a well. When the priest was arrested by a prince on false charges, the animals came to his rescue. The paintings shows these animals bringing gifts as a gratitude for saving their lives.

 I Gusti Nyoman Lempad (~1862–1978)
A true master and "Renaissance Man", Lempad is a  figure in the Balinese community as well as in artistic circles abroad. His fame extends not only beyond geographical borders but also beyond the ordinary borders of craftsmanship and artistic expression. Lempad's specialty was classical scenes, rendered in a relatively formal way. To these he applied creative genius, and the passionate intensity of his personality, in creating works that inspired many artists who followed him. Although he maintained closed friendships with the foreign artists who lived in Bali, including Bonnet and Spies, Lempad never compromised his distinctive identity as a Balinese artist. Lempad had a broad range of talents in many art forms: including painting, sculpture and architecture. He designed some of the palaces and temples in and around Ubud, including parts of the Puri Lukisan Museum. He also painted the murals at the entrance of the North building of the museum. Lempad's drawing, the Dream of Dharmawangsa, is one of the masterpieces of the museum and is rendered in his unique linear style.

 Anak Agung Gde Sobrat (1919–1992)
Sobrat was the son of an aristocratic family. As a child, he delighted in the spectacles of the Balinese Wayang Kulit (shadow puppet performances). His grandfather, a well-known Wayang puppeteer, taught him to carve the rawhide puppets and familiarized him with the Hindu epics: the Ramayana and Mahabharata. His artistic talent drew the attention of other artists. Under the tutelage of Walter Spies, he learned to paint Balinese landscapes with surreal perspectives, and later from Bonnet he developed the techniques for portraiture. From 1957 to 1959, Sobrat taught at the highly regarded Academy of Fine Arts in Yogyakarta, where he developed his academic style. His painting of the Balinese Market was exhibited at the opening of the Museum Puri Lukisan and remains one of its masterpieces. Although the colors have faded, the composition of human figures clearly shows the influence of Bonnet.

 I Gusti Made Deblog (1910–1978)
This exceptional artist started his career as an apprentice in the studio of the Chinese photographer, Yap Sin Tin. Deblog's work portrays a passionate sense of the beauty of nature, rendered in elegantly refined detail that reveals the presence of a deeper reality underlying the world around us. His drawing, the Birth of Hanuman (1936) was presented to the Puri Lukisan Museum by the chairman of the Ford Foundation, and depicts a lush forest with magical nymphs and other forest dwellers bringing offerings to the newborn Hanuman.

Noted Exhibitions 
 Pre-War Balinese Modernist (1999)
Featuring the pre-War Balinese paintings from the Leo Haks collection. Over 100 paintings and drawings were personally selected by Leo Haks to showcase the pre-War works of artists from Ubud, Sanur and Batuan. Many of the pieces came from the paintings collected by Gregory Bateson and Margaret Mead during their field study in Bali from 1935 to 1937.

 Pioneers of Balinese Painting (July 14 - September 12, 2008)
Featuring masterpieces of Balinese art on loan from the Leiden University Museum, collected between 1929 and 1958 by Dutch artist Rudolf Bonnet, this exhibition showcases the specific characteristics, and style of Balinese artists from four geographic regions: Tampaksiring, Ubud, Batuan and Sanur. The Leiden University collection was supplemented by similar works from the permanent collection of the Puri Lukisan Museum, which were also selected by Rudolf Bonnet. This exhibition is accompanied by a catalogue entitled “Pioneers of Balinese Painting” by Helena Spannjard.

 Ida Bagus Made (July 14 - December 31, 2008)
In 2000, following the artist's last wish, the widow of Ida Bagus Made loaned about 100 paintings from the artist's private collection to the Puri Lukisan Museum. Fifty of these paintings will be presented to the public for the first time. This exhibition is accompanied by a catalogue: “Ida Bagus Made – the Art of Devotion” co-authored by Kaja McGowan et al.

 Illuminating Line - Masterworks of I Gusti Nyoman Lempad (September 22 - December 18, 2014)
Featuring masterworks of I Gusti Nyoman Lempad (~1862 - 1978) from major public and private collections around the world: American Museum of Natural History (New York), Library of Congress (Washington DC), Lois Bateson Collection; Tropen Museum (Amsterdam), Royal Ethnographic Museum (Leiden), Welt Museum Wien (Vienna), and Dance Museum (Stockholm). This exhibition is accompanied by a catalogue: “Lempad of Bali – the Illuminating Line” co-authored by Bruce Carpenter, John Darling, Heidi Hinzler, Kaja McGowan, Adrian Vickers and Soemantri Widagdo.

See also 
 Ubud

References

Literature

External links 
  of Museum Puri Lukisan

Museums in Bali
Art museums and galleries in Indonesia
Ubud